Under the Radar Volume 3 is a compilation album by English singer Robbie Williams, comprising demos, B-sides and rarities. It was released exclusively through Williams' website on 14 February 2019.

On 28 November 2018 Williams had announced that his next album, Under the Radar Volume 3, would be released in early 2019 and was available to pre-order from his official website.

Background 
In Williams' own words: "Announcing another 'Under The Radar' album for the fans makes me really happy. These are songs and versions of songs from the archives that people haven’t heard before. I'm proud of them, I'm really attached to them and I'm delighted to be sharing them in the third album of the series."

The cover features a nude photo of Williams in Puerto Madero, Buenos Aires, Argentina.

Release 
The album was announced on 28 November 2018. On the same day, Williams released "I Just Want People To Like Me" and its official music video, which was shot on a Mexico City rooftop during The Heavy Entertainment Show Tour.

Track listing

References 

2019 compilation albums
Robbie Williams albums